The 119th Pennsylvania House of Representatives District is located in Luzerne County and has been represented by Alec Ryncavage since 2023. The 119th district includes the following areas:

 Ashley
 Edwardsville
 Fairview Township
 Hanover Township
 Larksville
 Nanticoke
 Newport Township
 Plymouth
 Plymouth Township
 Rice Township
 Sugar Notch
 Warrior Run
 Wright Township

Representatives

Recent election results

References

External links
District Map from the United States Census Bureau
Pennsylvania House Legislative District Maps from the Pennsylvania Redistricting Commission.  
Population Date for District 45 from the Pennsylvania Redistricting Commission.

Government of Luzerne County, Pennsylvania
119